Kawa is a site in Sudan, located between the Third and Fourth Cataracts of the Nile on the east bank of the river, across from Dongola. In ancient times it was the site of several temples to the Egyptian god Amun, built by the Egyptian rulers Amenhotep III and Tutankhamun, and by Taharqa and other Kushite kings.

Shrine of Taharqa
A small temple of Taharqa was once located at Kawa in Nubia (modern Sudan).  It is located today in the Ashmolean Museum.

See also 
Anlamani

References

History of Nubia
Former populated places in Sudan
Twenty-fifth Dynasty of Egypt
Nubia
Archaeological sites in Sudan
Nubians in Sudan
Kushite cities